Kampong Amo is a village in Temburong District, Brunei, about  from the district town Bangar. The population was 507 in 2016; primary ethnic groups include Iban, Murut and Malays.

Administration 
Kampong Amo is one of the villages within Mukim Amo. It is further divided into three administrative villages: Kampong Amo 'A', 'B' and 'C'. The current postcode is PD1151.

Facilities 
Amo Primary School is the village's government primary school. It also shares grounds with Amo Religious School, the village's government school for the country's Islamic religious primary education.

References 

Amo